Motel Hell is a 1980 American comedy horror film directed by Kevin Connor and starring Rory Calhoun, Nancy Parsons, and Nina Axelrod. The plot follows farmer, butcher, motel manager, and meat entrepreneur Vincent Smith, who traps travelers and harvests them for his human sausages.

Because of its low budget, the original intent was to make a serious horror film, with moments of disturbing wit and irony. It is often seen as a satire of modern horror films such as Psycho and The Texas Chain Saw Massacre.

Plot
Farmer Vincent Smith and his younger sister Ida live on a farm with an attached motel, named "Motel Hello". Vincent's renowned smoked meats are actually human flesh. He sets traps on nearby roads to catch victims. He buries the victims up to their necks in his "secret garden", then cuts their vocal cords to prevent them from screaming. They are kept in the ground and fed until they are ready for "harvest". Ida helps Vincent, as they both see the victims as animals.

Vincent shoots out the front tire of a couple's motorcycle. The male, Bo, is placed in the garden, but Vincent brings the female, Terry, to the motel. Sheriff Bruce, Vincent's naive younger brother, arrives the next morning. Vincent tells Terry her boyfriend died in the accident and was buried. A trip to the graveyard shows his crude grave marker. With nowhere to go, Terry decides to stay at the motel. She gradually becomes attracted to Vincent's honest manner and folksy charm, much to Bruce's dismay, who tries to woo her without success.

Vincent captures more victims by placing wooden cardboards of cows in the middle of the highway to cause his victims to stop, allowing him to capture them. He also places a fake ad and lures in a pair of swingers, believing the hotel to be a swing joint. The next day, Vincent suggests he teach Terry to smoke meat. Ida becomes jealous and attempts to drown Terry, but Vincent arrives to save her. This causes Terry to fall in love with him completely, and she tries to seduce Vincent. Vincent denies her advances, saying they must marry first. She agrees to marry the following day.

Bruce visits the motel to protest Terry's choice. He tells Terry that Vincent has "syphilis of the brain". Vincent arrives and drives off his brother with a shotgun. Vincent, Terry, and Ida drink champagne, but Ida drugs Terry's glass and she faints. Ida and Vincent then prepare some victims for the wedding. Meanwhile, Bruce investigates the disappearances and becomes suspicious of his brother.

Vincent and Ida kill three victims and take them to the slaughterhouse. As they remove the victims' bodies, the dirt around Bo loosens and he begins to escape. Bruce sneaks back to the motel to rescue Terry, but Ida returns. She ambushes Bruce and knocks him out, then holds Terry at gunpoint to the meat processing plant where Vincent reveals his secret. Terry is horrified by the prospect of smoking human flesh. Meanwhile, Bo escapes and frees the other victims from the garden. Ida goes back to the motel to get something to eat, but the victims attack her and knock her out. Terry tries to escape, but Vincent gases her and ties her to a conveyor belt. He is interrupted by Bo, who crashes through a window, but Vincent strangles the weakened Bo.

Bruce awakens and finds one of his brother's shotguns. He goes to the plant but finds that his brother has armed himself with a giant chainsaw and placed a pig's head over his own as a gruesome mask. Vincent disarms his brother, but Bruce grabs his own chainsaw and duels Vincent. During the fight, the belt restraining Terry is activated, sending her slowly to a cutting blade. Despite his wounds, Bruce drives the chainsaw deep into Vincent's side. Bruce frees Terry and returns to Vincent. He gasps his final words, leaving the farm and "secret garden" to Bruce and lamenting his own hypocrisy for using preservatives.

Bruce and Terry go to the "secret garden" and find only Ida, who is buried head first. As they leave the motel, Bruce comments he is glad he left home when he was eleven. Terry suggests burning the motel, claiming it is evil. The neon sign saying "Motel Hello" fully short-circuits, permanently darkening the "O".

Cast

Production
Motel Hell was written and produced by brothers Robert Jaffe and Steven-Charles Jaffe, who, up to that point, had never worked on a screenplay together. According to Robert, the story "sprung forth full-blown from our demented minds". The screenplay was finished around 1977, after four weeks, although selling it proved difficult. According to Steven-Charles, studios "either hated it or thought it was the most bizarre script they'd ever read". The Jaffes had been impressed by director Tobe Hooper's 1974 horror film The Texas Chain Saw Massacre, and Universal Pictures planned to produce Motel Hell at one point with Hooper directing. However, the studio backed out of the project upon reading the script, which Robert speculated was "probably a little too far out for their tastes". United Artists (UA) also rejected it, but reconsidered several months later, following executive changes and the rising popularity of shock films. The Jaffes eventually reached a production deal with UA.

Besides Hooper, the Jaffes had also been impressed with director Kevin Connor's 1974 horror film From Beyond the Grave, and ultimately hired him to direct Motel Hell. They were both pleased with his work, especially his handling of the film's "very fine line of black humor". Gore and graphic violence were kept to a minimum, making for dramatic effect whenever they were used. The film's budget was just over $3 million. Filming began on April 23, 1980, and concluded on June 12. A primary filming location was the Sable Ranch in Santa Clarita, California. Most of the interior filming took place at Laird International Studios in Culver City, California. A day of filming also took place in Moorpark, California. The score, composed by Lance Rubin, was recorded at Warner Brothers Studios.

Release

Critical response
On the review aggregator website Rotten Tomatoes, Motel Hell holds a 67% approval rating based on 27 critic reviews, with an average rating of 5.8/10. The consensus reads: "Eerie and satirical, Motel Hell has no vacancy when it comes to low-brow horror gags.” On Metacritic, the film has an average score of 64 out of 100, based on reviews from seven critics, indicating "generally favorable reviews".

Roger Ebert gave the film a score of three out of four stars, writing: "What Motel Hell brings to this genre is the refreshing sound of laughter. This movie is disgusting, of course; it's impossible to satirize this material, I imagine, without presenting the subject matter you're satirizing." Adam Tyner of DVD Talk gave the film four out of five stars, writing, "With its cacklingly dark sense of humor and some unforgettably twisted visuals, Motel Hell still feels fresh and wildly unique even all these decades later." The Terror Trap gave the film 3/4 stars, calling it "A thoroughly enjoyable low budget horror with effective, low key doses of black humor". Anthony Arrigo from Dread Central rated the film a score of 4/5, calling it "a darkly humorous film, played straight, replete with equal parts hilarity and horror". Brett Gallman from Oh, the Horror! praised the film, calling it a successful imitator of Tobe Hooper's The Texas Chain Saw Massacre. Comparing it to Hooper's film, Gallman wrote, "Motel Hell is one such successful imitator because it doesn’t just tap into these comedic implications—it unlooses them like a driller would a fount of oil, as its crude but wicked sense of comedy eventually spews forth, soaking the film’s proceedings with an offbeat vibe that forces audiences to consider just what in the hell is really going on here."

Arrow in the Head rated the film 7/10, commending the film's acting, direction, and humor, but writing that the pacing, script, and finale should have been tighter.

Author and film critic Leonard Maltin awarded the film one-and-a-half out of four stars. In his review, Maltin wrote that, although it was nice to see Rory and Wolfman share screen credit and commended its lively finale, he felt that the film still failed to distinguish itself. TV Guide wrote, "Motel Hell could have been a great black comedy, but the uneasy direction of Kevin Connor fails to get most of the picture off the ground." Dennis Schwartz from Ozus' World Movie Reviews gave the film a grade C−, writing that it is "tasteless, gruesomely awkward and moronic". Chuck Bowen from Slant awarded the film three out of five stars, writing that, although the horror portion of the film was somewhat effective, it failed to be even remotely funny.

Home media

It would take six years from its theatrical release in 1980 for “Motel Hell” to arrive on VHS courtesy of MGM, in an over-sized box featuring the original poster art. It had several rereleases, all from MGM until eventually appearing on DVD.

In 2002, MGM released Motel Hell as part of its "Midnite Movies" collection of double-feature DVDs with the 1974 Deranged. On May 13, 2013, Arrow Video released the film on Blu-ray in Region B in the U.K.

On August 12, 2014, Scream Factory released a Region A Blu-ray for distribution in the United States and Canada.

Legacy
Motel Hell has gained a cult following over the years. The film is referenced in the weird horror short story "Metaphysica Morum" by Thomas Ligotti. The film is similarly referenced in Ligotti's 2010 book The Conspiracy Against the Human Race, his only non-fiction work.

See also
 Karl Denke – a German serial killer and cannibal believed to have sold the flesh of his victims as meat to unsuspecting customers

References

Citations

Bibliography

External links
 
 
 
 
 

1980 films
1980 horror films
American comedy horror films
Films directed by Kevin Connor
Films produced by Steven-Charles Jaffe
Films set on farms
Films set in motels
Films shot in California
American satirical films
United Artists films
American serial killer films
Films about cannibalism
Films about siblings
1980s English-language films
1980s American films
English-language comedy horror films